Karl Müller (born 10 December 1912) was a Swiss rower. He competed at the 1936 Summer Olympics in Berlin with the men's coxless pair where they came fifth.

References

Swiss male rowers
Olympic rowers of Switzerland
Rowers at the 1936 Summer Olympics
European Rowing Championships medalists
1912 births
Year of death missing